Ural may refer to:

Physical geography 
Ural (region), in Russia and Kazakhstan
Ural Mountains, in Russia and Kazakhstan
Ural (river), in Russia and Kazakhstan
Ural Ocean, an ancient ocean
14519 Ural, an asteroid

Human geography 
Ural District (disambiguation)
Ural Oblast (disambiguation)
Ural (region)
Ural economic region, in Russia
Ural (rural locality), several rural localities in Russia

Transport 
Ural Airlines, a Russian airline based in Yekaterinburg
Ural Automotive Plant (brand name "Ural"):
Ural-375D, a military truck manufactured by Ural Automotive Plant
Ural-4320, a military truck manufactured by Ural Automotive Plant
Ural-5323, a military truck manufactured by Ural Automotive Plant
Ural 63055 and Ural-63059, variants of Ural Typhoon, a Russian armored vehicle
Ural bomber, aircraft design program to design a long-range bomber for Luftwaffe
IMZ-Ural, a Russian motorcycle manufacturer
Ural (ship), two Russian ships

People 
Esra Ural (born 1991), Turkish women's basketball player
Fulden Ural (born 1991), Turkish women's volleyball player
Göktürk Gökalp Ural (born 1995), Turkish basketball player
Mihrac Ural (born 1956), Turkish militant
Murat Ural (born 1987), Swiss soccer player
Onur Ural (born 1997), Turkish football player
Ural Akbulut (born 1945), Turkish chemist
Ural Amirov (born 1980), Russian football player
Ural Latypov (born 1951), Belarusian politician
Ural Rakhimov (born 1961), Russian businessman
Ural Tansykbayev (1904–1974), Uzbek painter
Ural Thomas (born 1939), American singer

Sports 
PBC Ural Great Perm, a basketball club in Perm, Russia
FC Ural, an association football club in Russia
Ural Ufa, a volleyball club in Ufa, Russia

Other uses 
Ural (computer)
14519 Ural, an asteroid
Ual (tool), a mortar tool used by the Bodo people of India
Ural Bey, an antagonist in Diriliş: Ertuğrul
Ural (almanac), a Soviet magazine
The Urals (game), a boardgame

See also
Uralic (disambiguation), for Uralic peoples and their culture
Uralsky (disambiguation)
Uralsk, several rural localities in Russia
Urals oil, a reference oil brand
Eural (disambiguation)